Thomas Kaminski (born 23 October 1992) is a Belgian professional footballer who plays as a goalkeeper for  club Blackburn Rovers.

Club career

Germinal Beerschot
Kaminski debuted in the Belgian top league for Germinal Beerschot in May 2009. He became the starting goalkeeper in the 2010–11 season.

OH Leuven
In August 2011, Kaminski signed a one-year contract with Oud-Heverlee Leuven.

Anderlecht
He also signed an agreement which tied him to Anderlecht at the end of that season. He played his first match for Anderlecht on 25 August 2012 against Oud-Heverlee Leuven. In summer 2015 Kaminski was loaned by F.C. Copenhagen.

Blackburn Rovers
On 26 August 2020, Kaminski joined EFL Championship side Blackburn Rovers for an undisclosed fee. Kaminski signed a two-year-deal with the club, with the option of a further year.

After his move to England, Kaminski was required to go into quarantine as part of the UK's COVID-19 measures at the time. He went on to make his Championship debut for Blackburn on 12 September, in the club's 3–2 defeat by Bournemouth. By the end of Blackburn's 2020–21 season, Kaminski appeared for the club competitively on 44 occasions, with Kaminski's impressive performances during the season seeing him become a fan-favourite of the Rovers supporters and being named as Player of the Season. In February 2022 he signed a contract extension until the end of the 2024–25 season.

International career 
Whilst Kaminski has represented Belgium's youth teams at its U15, U16, U17, U19 and U21 levels, Kaminski is also eligible to play for Poland due to his father being of Polish descent.

In May 2014, prior to the start of Belgium's 2014 FIFA World Cup campaign, Kaminski was called up to the national team's senior side for the first time after Thibaut Courtois was rested following his appearance in the 2014 UEFA Champions League Final and injuries to Koen Casteels, Silvio Proto and Simon Mignolet left the side with no other available options. 

Kaminski made the bench for Belgium's 5–1 defeat of Luxembourg in a friendly on 26 May, but the record of the match was dismissed by FIFA due to the side making seven substitutes instead of the maximum six substitutes permitted. Following the return of Courtois and Mignolet to the side, Kaminski's stint with the national team came to an end. 

On 9 October 2020, Kaminski was called up by Belgium manager Roberto Martínez for the side's UEFA Nations League games against England and Iceland. It was the first time Kaminski had been called by his national side in more than six years. He was then called up a month later on 9 November due to an injury to Anderlecht goalkeeper Hendrik Van Crombrugge, although he was forced to withdraw two days later due to testing positive for COVID-19. 

On 19 March 2021, Kaminski was called up yet again by Martínez, for the nation's 2022 FIFA World Cup qualifiers against Wales, Czech Republic and Belarus. In June, Kaminski was called up for friendly games against Greece and Croatia ahead of its UEFA Euro 2020 campaign, although Kaminski didn't initially make the squad for the tournament, until he was called up as a replacement for the injured Mignolet on 28 June. It was the first time that Kaminski had been called up by Belgium for a major tournament. His link-up with the squad didn't last long, however, as Belgium were defeated 2–1 by Italy in the quarter-finals.  

Kaminski was called up for the sixth time in under a year as he was named as part of Martínez's squad for the national's teams upcoming World Cup qualifiers against Estonia and the Czech Republic in August. He was called up, yet again, on 15 November for Belgium's World Cup qualifier against Wales. Despite having been called up by Belgium on seven occasions by this point, Kaminski is yet to make his senior national team debut.

Personal life 
Kaminski is of Belgian descent through his mother and Polish descent through his father.

Career statistics

Honours 
Anderlecht
 Belgian Pro League: 2012–13, 2013–14
 Belgian Super Cup: 2012, 2013, 2014

Copenhagen
 Danish Superliga: 2015–16
 Danish Cup: 2015–16
Individual

 Blackburn Rovers Player of the Season: 2020–21

References 

 Thomas Kaminski verkast van Anderlecht naar Kortrijk, nieuwsblad.be, 13 June 2016

External links 

 
 

1992 births
Living people
People from Dendermonde
Footballers from East Flanders
Association football goalkeepers
Belgian footballers
Belgium youth international footballers
Belgium under-21 international footballers
Belgian people of Polish descent
A.F.C. Tubize players
K.A.A. Gent players
Beerschot A.C. players
Oud-Heverlee Leuven players
R.S.C. Anderlecht players
Anorthosis Famagusta F.C. players
F.C. Copenhagen players
K.V. Kortrijk players
Blackburn Rovers F.C. players
Belgian Pro League players
Cypriot First Division players
Danish Superliga players
English Football League players
UEFA Euro 2020 players
Belgian expatriate footballers
Belgian expatriate sportspeople in Cyprus
Expatriate footballers in Cyprus
Belgian expatriate sportspeople in Denmark
Expatriate men's footballers in Denmark
Belgian expatriate sportspeople in England
Expatriate footballers in England